Godey is a surname. Notable people with the surname include:
 Louis Antoine Godey (1804–1878), American editor and publisher
 Louis-Luc Godey (1813–1873), French mycologist
 Alexis Godey (1818-1889), frontiersman, scout, explorer

See also 
 Morton Freedgood (1913–2006), American author who wrote under the pen name John Godey
 Gode, Ethiopia